Strength athletics in Finland refers to the participation of Finnish competitors and events in the field of strength athletics in association with the World's Strongest Man.

History
Finland had enormous success on the international stage in the 1990s and early 2000s, having won 3 World's Strongest Man titles, and numerous major European and international competitions. In particular, Jouko Ahola was the 1997 World's Strongest Man & 1999 World's Strongest Man champion, Janne Virtanen won the 2000 World's Strongest Man, and Riku Kiri was a 3 time consecutive Europe's Strongest Man champion from 1995-1997. In recent years Finland has struggled in the major international scene, having not made the finals of WSM since 2002, and not having any major international victories.

National competitions

Finland's Strongest Man

Finland's Strongest Man is an annual strongman held every year in Finland since 1987. Jón Páll Sigmarsson, Bill Kazmaier and Hjalti Arnason were guests in the competition but their placings were not included in the final results. Both Janne Virtanen and Jani Illikainen hold the record with 4 wins, Ilkka Nummisto and Riku Kiri hold 3 wins each as well.

Top 3 placings

Results courtesy of David Horne's World of Grip: http://www.davidhorne-gripmaster.com/strongmanresults.html

Repeat champions

Regional competitions

Nordic Strongman Championships
The Nordic Strongman Championships consists of athletes from Iceland, Norway, Sweden, Finland and Denmark.

References

Strongmen competitions
Finland
Sport in Finland